Kanyadaan  is a 2020 Indian Bengali Language Drama television series which is premiered on 7 December  2020 on Bengali general entertainment channel Sun Bangla. The show is produced by Arup Kumar Som and Sayantan Som Chitrayon of Babu Banik Production Chitrayon and stars Arindram Ganguly, Priya Malakar and Manasi Sinha.

Cast
 Arindam Ganguly as Anjan Basu: Tithi, Nira, Moon, Bithi and Jinuk's father.
 Royshreema Das / Deepsheta Mitra as Tithi: Anjan's daughter; Nira, Moon, Bithi and Jinuk's sister; Rana's wife.
 Priya Malakar as Nira: Anjan's daughter; Tithi, Moon, Bithi and Jinuk's sister; Indra's wife.
 Swapnila Chakraborty as Moon: Anjan's daughter; Tithi, Nira, Bithi and Jinuk's sister; Robi's wife. 
 Ritobrota Dey as Bithi:Anjan's daughter; Tithi, Nira, Moon and Jinuk's sister; Sayan's wife. 
 Laboni Ghosh as Jinuk:Anjan's daughter; Tithi, Nira, Moon and Bithi's sister. 
 Ridish Chowdhury / Raj Bhattacharya / Aditya Roy as Rana: Tithi's husband. 
 Nilankur Mukhopadhyay as Indra: Nira's husband.
 Daipayan Chakraborty as Bishu: Trisha's first husband; Moon's love interest. 
 Neil Chatterjee as Sayan: Bithi's husband
 Aditya Chowdhury as Robi: Moon's husband
 Debojyoti Roy Chowdhury as Dr. Ayon

Recurring 
 Manasi Sinha / Swagata Mukherjee as Mandira: Indra's mother.
 Debipriya Sarkar as Sona: Indra's sister; Sagnik's wife.
 Atmadeep Ghosh as Sagnik: Sona's husband.
 Shabnam Mustafi as Trisha: Mainak's wife; Bishu's former wife.
 Joy Banerjee as Mainak: Trisha's second husband. 
 Ananda Chowdhury as Shiladitya: Trisha's brother.
 Sreejita Biswas as Snigdha: Bishu's love interest; Koushik's fiancee.
 Sudip Sengupta as Koushik: Snigdha's fiance. 
 Sagar Sinha as Ranjan:  Sona's former lover.
 Indranil Mallick as Abir: Bithi's former lover. 
 Priyanka Rati Pal as Borsha: Indra's lover.
 Anindita Das as Nima
 Shubhanki Dhar as Kaveri
 Raima Sengupta as Nirmala
 Saibal Bhattacharya as Robi's father
 Parometa Mukherjee as Robi's mother
 Sukanya Basu as Sivani
 Anaya Ghosh as Mita
 Toushik Chakraborty as Rahul

Adaptations

References

Bengali-language television programming in India
Sun Bangla original programming
2020 Indian television series debuts
Bengali-language television series based on Tamil-language television series